North Stack (Welsh: Ynys Arw, meaning "rugged island") is a small island situated just off Holy Island on the north-west coast of Anglesey.

Description
North Stack, or Gogarth North Stack, can also refer to the headland opposite the island. This is the site of a redundant fog warning station, comprising a number of buildings, including the Trinity House Magazine, built-in 1861, where shells for the warning cannon were stored. These buildings now house a bird-watching observatory, giving a view of South Stack lighthouse across Gogarth Bay, and the studio of artist Philippa Jacobs.

Rock climbing
The Precambrian quartzite cliffs of this headland, including the North Stack Walls and Wen Zawn, provide one of the largest areas for rock climbs in Britain, and contain important traditional climbing routes such as A Dream of White Horses (HVS 4c, Ed Drummond and Dave Pearce, 1968), The Cad (E6 6a, Ron Fawcett, 1978), The Bells! The Bells! (E7 6b, John Redhead, 1980) and Conan the Librarian (E7 6b, Johnny Dawes, Craig Smith, 1986)

Crash site
The stack was the site of a crash of a B-24 bomber of the US Eighth Air Force  on 22 December 1944  that killed the eight crew on board.

Gallery

References

External links
 Rock climbing at North Stack

Islands of Anglesey
Uninhabited islands of Wales
Precambrian Europe
Quartzite formations
Trearddur
Tourist attractions in Anglesey
Climbing areas of Wales